Elsick House is a historic house in Kincardineshire (now part of Aberdeenshire), North-East Scotland. It is situated in an agricultural area about two miles from the North Sea near the town of Newtonhill; the Elsick Estate is situated within the watershed of the Burn of Elsick, a stream that traverses the estate. The house is located on the Elsick Estate, and is the present family seat of the Duke of Fife.

Early area history
Elsick House is located near the ancient Causey Mounth trackway, which road was constructed in medieval times to make passable this only available route across the coastal region of the Grampian Mounth connecting points south of Stonehaven to Aberdeen. This ancient drovers' road specifically connected the River Dee crossing (where the present Bridge of Dee is situated) via Portlethen Moss, Muchalls Castle and Stonehaven to the south. The route was that taken by William Keith, 7th Earl Marischal and the Marquess of Montrose when they led a Covenanter army of 9000 men in the first battle of the Civil War in 1639.

See also
Cookney Church
Bannerman baronets
Chapelton of Elsick

References

Country houses in Aberdeenshire